Emilio Rodríguez Barros (28 November 1923, Ponteareas, Spain – 21 February 1984, Ponteareas, Spain) was a Spanish professional road bicycle racer from Ponteareas who won the King of the Mountains classification at Vuelta a España three times and captured the overall title at the 1950 Vuelta a España. Rodríguez's two brothers were also professional cyclists - his older brother Delio won the 1945 Vuelta a España and in total won 39 stages at the Vuelta a España. Emilio's other brother Manolo finished second in the general classification of the edition that Emilio won.

Major results

1946
 1st Overall Tour of Galicia
 8th Overall Vuelta a España
 1st  Mountains classification
1947
 1st Overall Volta a Catalunya
 1st Stage 2
 1st Overall Vuelta a Asturias
 1st Overall Tour of Galicia
 1st Stage 1 Vuelta a Burgos
 4th Overall Vuelta a España
 1st  Mountains classification
 1st Stage 2 
1948
 1st Overall Volta a Catalunya
 1st Overall Volta a la Comunitat Valenciana
 2nd Overall Vuelta a España
1950
 1st  Overall Vuelta a España
 1st  Mountains classification
 1st Stages 3, 4b, 6, 7 & 22
1954
 1st  Road race, National Road Championships
 4th Overall Euskal Bizikleta
1955
1st Overall Tour of Galicia
 5th Overall Vuelta a Asturias
 1st Stage 1

External links 

Official Tour de France results for Emilio Rodríguez

1923 births
1984 deaths
People from Ponteareas
Sportspeople from the Province of Pontevedra
Cyclists from Galicia (Spain)
Vuelta a España winners
Spanish Vuelta a España stage winners
Spanish male cyclists